Chornomorske Raion is one of the 25 regions of Crimea, currently subject to a territorial dispute between the Russian Federation and Ukraine. Population: 

It is located in the far west of the republic on the Tarkhankut Peninsula. The raion's administrative centre is the town of Chornomorske.

References

External links

 

Raions of Crimea